The 2017 La Flèche Wallonne was a road cycling one-day race that took place between Binche and Huy in Belgium, on 19 April 2017. It was the 81st edition of the La Flèche Wallonne and the seventeenth event of the 2017 UCI World Tour.

Spanish rider Alejandro Valverde won the race atop the Mur de Huy for the fourth successive year, and a record-extending fifth victory overall. Of the race's 200 starters, 166 riders finished the race.

Teams
As La Flèche Wallonne was a UCI World Tour event, all eighteen UCI WorldTeams were invited automatically and obliged to enter a team in the race. Seven UCI Professional Continental teams competed, completing the 25-team peloton.

Result

References

External links

2017 UCI World Tour
2017 in Belgian sport
2017
April 2017 sports events in Europe